Nationality words link to articles with information on the nation's poetry or literature (for instance, Irish or France).

Events
 January – Ezra Pound returns to Rapallo, Italy from Sicily to settle permanently after a brief stay the year before.
 February 11 – Eli Siegel wins The Nation Poetry Prize for "Hot Afternoons Have Been in Montana".  
 February 21 – First issue of The New Yorker magazine is published.
 November 21 – First issue of McGill Fortnightly Review, a publication of Montreal Group of modernist poets and the first organ to feature modernist poetry, fiction, and literary criticism in Canada.
 December 28 – Russian poet Sergei Yesenin (b. 1895) writes his farewell poem, "Goodbye, my friend, goodbye", in his own blood before hanging himself at the Angleterre Hotel in Leningrad.
 T. S. Eliot leaves Lloyds Bank in London and joins the new publishing house of Faber and Gwyer.
 An unofficial ban by Soviet authorities on poetry by Anna Akhmatova begins; she will be unable to publish until 1940.

Works published

Canada
 Arthur Bourinot, Pattering Feet: A book of childhood verses.
 Archibald Lampman, Lyrics of Earth: Sonnets and Ballads, Duncan Campbell Scott ed. Posthumously published—not to be confused with Lampman's 1895 book of the same name.
 Marjorie Pickthall:
Little Songs (Toronto: McClelland & Stewart)
The Complete Poems of Marjorie Pickthall (Toronto: McClelland & Stewart).
 E. J. Pratt, The Witches' Brew, Toronto: Macmillan.
Charles G. D. Roberts. The Sweet o' the Year and Other Poems. (Toronto: Ryerson).
Theodore Goodridge Roberts. Seven Poems. private.
 Seranus, Songs of Love and Labor (Toronto: Author).

India in English
 Shyam Sunder Lal Chordia, Seeking and Other Poems (Poetry in English), Allahabad: The Indian Press 
 M. U. Malkani and T. H. Advani, The Longing Lute (Poetry in English), Karachi: Kohinoor Printing Works

United Kingdom
 Edmund Blunden, Masks of Time
 Gordon Bottomley, Poems of Thirty Years
 Robert Bridges:
 New Verse Written in 1921 which included his Neo-Miltonic syllabics
 The Tapestry: Poems
 W. H. Davies, A Poet's Alphabet
 Cecil Day-Lewis, Beechen, Vigil, and Other Poems
 T. S. Eliot, Poems 1909-1925, including "The Hollow Men"
 'Gawain Poet' (14th century), Sir Gawain and the Green Knight, edited by J. R. R. Tolkien and E. V. Gordon
 Robert Graves, Welchman's Hose
 Graham Greene, Babbling April
 Thomas Hardy, Human Shows, Far Phantasies, Songs and Trifles, the last work published in the author's lifetime
 Hugh MacDiarmid, pen name of Christopher Murray Grieve, Sangshaw
 Edwin Muir, First Poems
 Edith Sitwell, Troy Park
 Sylvia Townsend Warner, The Espalier
 Humbert Wolfe, The Unknown Goddess
 W. B. Yeats, A Vision

United States
 Léonie Adams, Those Not Elect
 Maxwell Anderson, You Who Have Dreams
 Stephen Vincent Benét, Tiger Joy
 Countee Cullen:
On These I Stand, Harper & Row
 Color
 E. E. Cummings:
 & (self-published)
 XLI Poems
 Babette Deutsch, Honey Out of the Rock
 Hilda Doolittle ("H.D."), Collected Poems of H.D.
 John Gould Fletcher, Parables
 Robert Hillyer, The Halt in the Garden
 Robinson Jeffers, Roan Stallion
 William Ellery Leonard, Two Lives
 Archibald MacLeish, The Pot of Earth
 Ezra Pound, A Draft of XVI Cantos, Paris
 Edwin Arlington Robinson, Dionysius in Doubt
 Eli Siegel, "Hot Afternoons Have Been in Montana" 
 Ridgely Torrence, Hesperides

Other in English
 W. B. Yeats, A Vision, Ireland

Works published in other languages

France
 Guillaume Apollinaire, pen name of Wilhelm Apollinaris de Kostrowitzky, posthumously published (died 1918)
 Louis Aragon, 
 Antonin Artaud:
  ("The Umbilicus of Limbo"), poetry and essays, Paris: Nouvelle Revue Française
 
 André Breton, 
 Paul Claudel, 
 Max Jacob, 
 Francis Jammes:
 , Paris: Éditions Spes
 , published each year from 1922 to this year
 Raymond Radiguet, published posthumously (author died this year)
 Pierre Reverdy, 
 Jules Supervielle, 
 Charles Vildrac,

Indian subcontinent
Including all of the British colonies that later became India, Pakistan, Bangladesh, Sri Lanka and Nepal. Listed alphabetically by first name, regardless of surname:

Hindi
 Jayashankar Prasad,  poem on love and beauty
 Maithilisharan Gupta,  based on the Ram legend
 Mohan Lal Mahato Viyogi, verses on social and political problems

Telugu
 Devulapalli Krishna Shastri, a very prominent work of Telugu romantic literature
 Rayaprolu Subba Rao, lyrics

Other Indian languages
 Altaf Husain Hali, 11-volume anthology of Urdu poetry published from this year to 1943; each volume contains poems from several authors
 Ardoshir Faramji Kharbardar,  (Indian Parsi writing in Gujarati)
 Dimbeshwar Neog, Assamese-language
 Keshavkumar, also known as P. K. Atre, Marathi satirical and humorous poems
 Rabindranath Thakur, Bengali, includes love poems
 Sita Nath Brahma Chaudhury, Assamese
 Syed jalal, work of Urdu criticism; a study of four Urdu poets: Nazir Ahmad, Shibli, Azad, and Hali
 D. T. Tatacharya, satirical Sanskrit poem
 Tripuraneni Ramaswamy Choudhury, Telugu epic in four cantos

Spanish language
 Rafael Alberti,  ("Sailor on Land"); Spain
 Rafael Méndez Dorich,  (Buenos Aires), Peruvian poet published in Argentina
 José Gorostiza,  ("Songs to Sing on Boats"), Mexico
 Salvador Novo,  ("20 Poems"), Mexico
 Miguel de Unamuno,  ("From Fuerteventura to Paris"), Spain

Other languages
 Sophus Claussen, including  ("Revolt of the Atoms"), Denmark
 Uri Zvi Greenberg,  ("A Great Fear and the Moon"), Hebrew language, Mandatory Palestine
 Lionel Léveillé, French language, Canada
 Eugenio Montale,  ("Cuttlefish Bones"), first edition; second edition, 1928, with six new poems and an introduction by Alfredo Gargiulo; third edition, 1931, Lanciano: Carabba; Italy

Awards and honors
 Dial Award: E.E. Cummings
 Pulitzer Prize for Poetry: Edwin Arlington Robinson, The Man Who Died Twice

Births
Death years link to the corresponding "[year] in poetry" article:
 January 14 – Yukio Mishima , pen name of Kimitake Hiraoka  (died 1970), Japanese author, poet and playwright (Surname of this pen name: Mishima)
 January 20 – Jamiluddin Aali  (died 2015), Indian-born Urdu poet, critic, playwright, essayist, columnist and scholar
 February 8 – Francis Webb (died 1973) Australian poet
 February 20 – Rivka Basman Ben-Hayim, Lithuanian-born Yiddish poet and teacher
 February 22 – Gerald Stern, American
 February 27 – Kenneth Koch (died 2002) American poet, playwright, professor and prominent poet of the "New York School" of poetry
 March 10 – Manolis Anagnostakis (died 2005) Greek poet and critic
 March 13 – Inge Müller  (died 1966) East German
 March 14 – John Wain (died 1994) English poet, novelist and critic associated with the literary group The Movement.
 March 25 – Theodore Enslin (died 2011), American
 April 18 – Bob Kaufman (died 1986), American Beat poet and surrealist
 June 6 – Maxine Kumin (died 2014), American poet and author; Poet Laureate Consultant in Poetry to the Library of Congress in 1981–1982
 July 4 – Ciril Zlobec (died 2018), Slovene poet and politician
 August 1 – Ernst Jandl (died 2000), Austrian poet, author and translator
 August 12 – Donald Justice (died 2004), American poet and writing teacher
 August 16 – Bakhtiyar Vahabzadeh (died 2009), Azerbaijani poet and philologist
 September 16 – Samuel Menashe (died 2011), American poet; first to receive "The Neglected Masters Award" given by the U.S. Poetry Foundation in 2004
 October 8 – Philip Booth (died 2007), American poet and educator
 October 28 – Ian Hamilton Finlay (died 2006), Scottish poet, writer, artist and gardener
 November 15 – Heinz Piontek (died 2003), German
 November 27 – Munier Choudhury (died 1971), Bengali educator, playwright, literary critic and political dissident
 December 10 – Carolyn Kizer (died 2014), American poet and winner of the Pulitzer Prize for Poetry in 1985
 December 12 – Laurence Lerner (died 2016), South African-born poet and academic

Deaths
Death years link to the corresponding "[year] in poetry" article:
 January 31 – George Washington Cable, 80, American novelist and poet
 February 15 – Kinoshita Rigen , pen-name of Kinoshita Toshiharu (born 1886), Japanese Meiji- and Taishō-period tanka poet (surname of this pen name: Rigen)
 February 22 – Nina Salaman, 47 (born 1877), English poet noted for her translations from medieval Hebrew poetry; cancer
 May 12 – Amy Lowell, 51 (born 1874), American poet of the imagist school; posthumously wins the Pulitzer Prize for Poetry in 1926
 June 6 – Pierre Louÿs, 54 (born 1870), French poet
 June 17 – A. C. Benson, 63, English author and poet who wrote the words to "Land of Hope and Glory"
 June 27 – A. D. Godley, 69, Irish-born English classical scholar and writer of light verse
 September 11 – Gustav Kastropp, 81 (born 1844) German poet and librettist
 October 27 – Darrell Figgis, 43 (born 1882), Irish poet and nationalist; suicide
 December 28 – Sergei Yesenin, 30, Russian poet

See also

 Poetry
 List of poetry awards
 List of years in poetry
 New Objectivity in German literature and art

Notes

20th-century poetry
Poetry